The Imperial Philanthropic Society was the largest charity of the Russian Empire. The Philanthropic Society was founded on 16 May 1802 by Emperor Alexander I of Russia. Its motto was Love Thy Neighbour as Thyself.

References 

  Очерк деятельности Совета Императорского Человеколюбивого общества за сто лет, 1816-1916 гг. Пг., 1916.

Russian Empire
1802 in the Russian Empire
1802 establishments in the Russian Empire
1918 disestablishments in Russia
Charities based in Russia
Social welfare charities